The 32nd National Hockey League All-Star Game was held in Joe Louis Arena in Detroit, home to the Detroit Red Wings, on February 5, 1980. The Wales Conference all-star team won for the fifth consecutive time. Reggie Leach was voted MVP after scoring one goal and one assist. This was Wayne Gretzky's first appearance and Gordie Howe's 23rd and final All-Star game appearance.

Team rosters

Game summary

Goaltenders : 
 Wales  : Edwards (29:27 minutes), Meloche (30:33).
 Campbell : Esposito (15:10), Peeters (44:50).

Shots on goal : 
Wales (32) 10 - 05 - 17
Campbell (31) 15 - 04 - 11

Referee : Dave Newell

Linesmen : John D'Amico, Ray Scapinello

MVP: Reggie Leach, (Philadelphia Flyers)

Notes
Gary Sargent named to Wales team, but unable to participate due to injury. Although it was the biggest stage the sport's two greatest players ever shared, Gretzky and Howe, the game always will be remembered for the thunderous standing ovation fans showered upon Howe, Gretzky's childhood idol and one of the Motor City's most fabled sports legends. Howe was introduced last by the PA announcer and received a standing ovation for four minutes, before the announcer interrupted the crowd.

See also
1979–80 NHL season

References

 

All
National Hockey League All-Star Games
National Hockey League All-Star Game
National Hockey League All-Star Game
1980 in Detroit
Ice hockey competitions in Detroit